Raymond Henry Powell (November 16, 1925 – September 30, 1998) was a Canadian professional ice hockey player who played 31 games in the National Hockey League with the Chicago Black Hawks during the 1950–51 season. The rest of his career, which lasted from 1944 to 1961, was spent in the minor leagues.

Career statistics

Regular season and playoffs

References
 

1925 births
1998 deaths
Baltimore Blades (EHL) players
Brantford Lions players
Buffalo Bisons (AHL) players
Canadian expatriate ice hockey players in the United States
Canadian ice hockey centres
Chicago Blackhawks players
Fort Worth Rangers players
Ice hockey people from Ontario
Kansas City Pla-Mors players
Milwaukee Sea Gulls players
New Haven Eagles players
New York Rovers players
Omaha Knights (USHL) players
Pittsburgh Hornets players
Providence Reds players
Quebec Aces (QSHL) players
Sportspeople from Timmins